Donald A. Asmonga (February 15, 1928 – January 13, 2014) was an American basketball and baseball player. He played for the NBA's original Baltimore Bullets team during their final season in the league.

A guard, Asmonga played collegiately for the California University of Pennsylvania and also for Alliance College in Cambridge Springs, Pennsylvania. He played for the Baltimore Bullets (1953–54) of the NBA for 7 games. Before that, he had a brief stint with the Boston Red Sox.

References

External links
 

1928 births
2014 deaths
Baltimore Bullets (1944–1954) players
Basketball players from Pennsylvania
California Vulcans men's basketball players
People from Homestead, Pennsylvania
Point guards
Shooting guards
Undrafted National Basketball Association players
American men's basketball players